Huaibin County is a county in the southeast of Henan province, China, bordering Anhui province to the northeast. Situated along the Huai River (Huaihe), it is under the administration of Xinyang city.

Administrative divisions
As 2012, this county is divided to 5 towns and 5 townships.
Towns

Townships

Climate

References

County-level divisions of Henan
Xinyang